Muzaffar Shah I, born Zafar Khan, was the founder of the Muzaffarid dynasty in Medieval India, reigning over the Gujarat Sultanate from 1391 to 1403 and again from 1404 to 1411. 

He was appointed the governor of Gujarat by Tughluq dynasty of the Delhi Sultanate and later declared the independence of the Gujarat Sultanate while there was chaos in Delhi following Timur's invasion. He was deposed by his ambitious son Tatar Khan but he regained the throne shortly after, when he died.

Ancestors
Zafar Khan's father was Wajīh-al-Mulk, a noble in the court of the Sultan of Delhi, Firuz Shah Tughlaq. The dynasty was founded by Sultan Zafar Khan Muzaffar, who has been identified variously as a Rajput sect of Tonk, Rajputana, a Tank Rajput from Thanesar in modern-day Haryana, or a Tānk Khatri from southern Punjab. Other historians such as Dr. V.K Agnihotri and Saiyid Athar Abbas Rizvi even wrote that his father, Sadhāran, was a Jat convert to Islam. Firuz ennobled Sāhāran after he had given the sultan warm hospitality, his sister's hand in marriage, and converted to Islam.

Early life
Zafar Khan was born on Muharram 25, year 743 (30 June 1342).

Zafar Khan was a son of Wajih-ul-Mulk. According to a legend, saint Bukhari promised Gujarat to Zafar Khan prophetically in return of food provided to Fakirs at his house. He gave him handful of dates and declared, "Thy seed like unto these in number shall rule over Gujarat". The number of seeds varied from eleven to thirteen according to various sources.

Muhammad Bin Tughluq was on an expedition to intervene in a war but died at Thatta on the bank of the Indus river in 1351 from fever induced by a surfeit of fish. As he had no sons, his cousin Firuz Shah Tughluq succeeded.

Firuz Shah Tughluq appointed Malik Mufarrah, also known as Farhat-ul-Mulk Rasti Khan governor of Gujarat in 1377. In 1387, Sikandar Khan was sent to replace him, but he was defeated and killed by Farhat-ul-Mulk. Firuz Shah died in 1388 and his grandson, Ghiyas-ud-Din Tughlaq II succeeded but was reign only for five months. He was succeeded by another grandson Abu Bakr Shah but after nine months he was deposed by Firuz Shah's son, Nasir ud din Muhammad Shah III who ruled for three years 1389–1392.

Reign

Governor of Gujarat under Tughluqs (1391–1407)

In 1391, Sultan Nasir ud din Muhammad Shah III appointed Zafar Khan, the son of Wajih-ul-Mulk as governor of Gujarat and conferred him the title of Muzaffar Khan. In passing Nagor he was met by a deputation from Cambay, complaining of the tyranny of Rásti Khán. Consoling them, he proceeded to Pátan, the seat of government, and then marched against Rásti Khán. The armies met near the village of Kamboi, a dependency of Pátan, and Farhat-ul-Mulk Rásti Khán was slain and his army defeated. To commemorate the victory, Zafar Khán founded a village on the battle-field, which he named Jítpur (the city of victory), and then, starting for Cambay, redressed the grievances of the people. It was rumoured that Farhat-ul-Mulk was trying to establish independent rule in Gujarat. In 1392, Farhat-ul-Mulk was defeated and killed in the battle of Kambor (now Gambhu), near Anhilwada Patan and occupied the city of Anhilwada Patan. He founded Jitpur at the site of victory.

On the death of Nasir ud din Muhammad Shah III in 1392, his son Sikandar assumed the throne but he died just after 45 days. He was succeeded by his brother Nasir-ud-Din Mahmud Shah Tughluq II but his cousin Nusrat Khan also claimed similar rank in Firuzabad.

Zafar Khán's first warlike expedition was against the Rao of Idar, who, in 1393, had refused to pay the customary tribute, and this chief he humbled. The contemporary histories seem to show that the previous governors had recovered tribute from all or most of the chiefs of Gujarát except from the Ráo of Junagadh and the Rája of Rajpipla, who had retained their independence. Zafar Khán now planned an expedition against the celebrated Somnath temple, but, hearing that Ádil Khán of Ásír-Burhánpur had invaded Sultánpur and Nandurbar, he moved his troops in that direction, and Ádil Khán retired to Ásir.

In 1394, he marched against the Ráo of Junágaḍh and exacted tribute. Afterwards, proceeding to Somnath, he destroyed the temple, built an Jumma Mosque, introduced Islám, left Muslim law officers, and established a thána or post in the city of Somnáth Pátan or Deva Pátan. He heard that the Hindus of Mandu were oppressing the Muslims, and, accordingly, marching there, he beleaguered that fortress for a year, but failing to take it contented himself with accepting the excuses of the Rája. From Mándu he performed a pilgrimage to Ajmer. Here he proceeded against the chiefs of Sambhar and Dandwana, and then attacking the Rájputs of Delváḍa and Jháláváḍa, he defeated them, and returned to Pátan in 1396.

About this time his son Tátár Khán, leaving his baggage in the fort of Panipat, made an attempt on Delhi. But Iqbál Khán took the fort of Pánipat, captured Tátár Khán's baggage, and forced him to withdraw to Gujarát. In 1397, with the view of reducing Ídar, Zafar Khán besieged the fort, laying waste the neighbouring country.

In prevailing situation, Timur invaded India and marched on Delhi in 1398. In early 1399, he defeated Mahmud II and looted and destroyed the much of Delhi. Sultan Mahmud II escaped and after many wanderings, reached Patan. He hoped to secure Zafar Khan's alliance to march to Delhi but Zafar Khan declined. He went to Malwa where he was declined again by local governor. Meanwhile his Wazir Iqbal Khan had expelled Nusrat Khan from Delhi so he returned to Delhi but he had no longer enough authority over provinces which were ruled independently by his governors.

Before Zafar Khan had taken the Idar fort Zafar Khán received news of Timur's conquest of Delhi, and concluding a peace with the Ídar king, returned to Pátan. In 1398, hearing that the Somnáth people claimed independence, Zafar Khán led an army against them, defeated them, and established Islám on a firm footing.

In 1403, Zafar Khan's son Tatar Khan urged his father to march on Delhi, which he declined. As a result, in 1403, Tatar imprisoned him in Ashawal (future Ahmedabad) and declared himself sultan under the title of Muhammad Shah. He humbled the chief of Nandod in Rajpipla. He marched towards Delhi, but on the way he was poisoned by his uncle, Shams Khán Dandáni at Sinor on the north bank of the Narmada river. Some sources says he died naturally due to weather or due to his habit of heavy drinking. After the death of Muhammad Shah, Zafar was released from the prison in 1404. Zafar Khán asked his own younger brother Shams Khán Dandáni to carry on the government, but he refused. Zafar Khán accordingly sent Shams Khán Dandáni to Nágor in place of Jalál Khán Khokhar. Zafar took over the control over administration. In 1407, he declared himself as Sultan Muzaffar Shah at Birpur or Sherpur, took the insignia of royalty and issued coins in his name.

Gujarat Sultanate (1407–1411)

At this time Álp Khán, son of Diláwar Khán of Málwa, was rumoured to have poisoned his father and ascended the throne with the title of Sultán Hushang Ghori. On hearing this Muzaffar Sháh marched against Hushang and besieged him in Dhár.He had successful expedition against Dhar (Malwa) which came under his control.

Muzaffar handed Hushang to the charge of his brother Shams Khán, on whom he conferred the title of Nasrat Khán. Hushang remained a year in confinement, and Músa Khán one of his relations usurped his authority. On hearing this, Hushang begged to be released, and Muzaffar Sháh not only agreed to his prayer, but sent his grandson Áhmed Khán (later Ahmad Shah I) with an army to reinstate him. This expedition was successful; the fortress of Mándu was taken and the usurper Músa Khán was put to flight. Áhmed Khán returned to Gujarát in 1409–10 AD. Meanwhile Muzaffar advancing towards Delhi to aid Nasir-ud-Din Mahmud Shah Tughluq, prevented an intended attack on that city by Sultán Ibráhím of Jaunpur.

He had suppressed a rebellion or sent an unsuccessful expedition to Kanthkot in Kutch. According to Mirat-i-Ahmadi, he abdicated the throne in favour of his grandson Ahmad Shah I in 1410 due to his failing health. He died five months and 13 days later. According to Mirat-i-Sikandari, Ahmad Shah was going to an expedition to quell the rebellion of Kolis of Ashawal. After leaving Patan, he convened an assembly of Ulemas and asked a question that should he took retribution his father's unjust death. Ulemas replied in favour and he got the written answers. He returned to Patan and forced his grandfather Muzaffar Shah to drink poison which killed him. He was buried in Patan. Ahmad Shah I succeeded him at the age of 19 in 1411.

Notes

References

Bibliography

  
 
  

Gujarat sultans
1411 deaths
14th-century Indian monarchs
1342 births